Sixtus Signati (died 1540) was a Roman Catholic prelate who served as Bishop of Trevico (1521–1540).

On 10 May 1521, Sixtus Signati was appointed during the papacy of Pope Leo X as Bishop of Trevico.
He served as Bishop of Trevico until his death in 1540.

References

External links and additional sources
 (for the Chronology of Bishops using non-Latin names) 
 (for the Chronology of Bishops using non-Latin names)  

16th-century Italian Roman Catholic bishops
Bishops appointed by Pope Leo X
1540 deaths